Līksna is a village in Līksna Parish, Augšdaugava Municipality in the Latgale region of Latvia.

It is the birthplace of Eduard von der Ropp, a Roman Catholic bishop in Tiraspol, Vilnius and Mahiliou. In was also the place Polish-Lithuanian hero, Countess Emilia Plater, was raised in.

References

External links 
Satellite map at Maplandia.com
 Liksna in the Geographical Dictionary of the Kingdom of Poland (1892)

Towns and villages in Latvia
Augšdaugava Municipality
Latgale